Tom Miller Dam is a dam located on the Colorado River within the city limits of Austin, Texas, United States. The City of Austin, aided by funds from the Public Works Administration, constructed the dam for the purpose of flood control and for generating hydroelectric power. Named after Robert Thomas Miller, a former Mayor of Austin, the dam forms Lake Austin, one of the Texas Highland Lakes.

The dam began operating in 1940 and is located at the site of the city's two previous dams, each of which were destroyed during major floods and shared the same name, Austin Dam. It is currently leased to the Lower Colorado River Authority, who maintains and operates the dam.

See also

Austin Dam failure

References

External links

Buildings and structures in Austin, Texas
Dams in Texas
Historic American Engineering Record in Texas
Hydroelectric power plants in Texas
Lower Colorado River Authority dams
Energy infrastructure completed in 1940
Public Works Administration in Texas